Hizatul Isham bin Abdul Jalil or more commonly known as Isham Jalil, is a Malaysian politician who is a member of the United Malays National Organisation (UMNO), a component party of the Barisan Nasional (BN) coalition. He has served as Information Chief of UMNO since November 2022 and Member of the Supreme Council of UMNO since June 2022. He served as State Information Chief of BN of Selangor from May 2020 to his removal from the position in June 2022.

Early life and education
He graduated Bachelor of Engineering at the University of Bristol and completed his master’s degree in Business Administration (MBA) from The Wharton School, University of Pennsylvania and a master's in Public Administration (MPA) from Harvard University.

Early career
Isham spent most of his career within the Prime Minister's Office under the former Prime Minister Najib Razak where he served as the Special Officer to the Prime Minister  and the former director at the Economic Planning Unit. Previously, he worked for Tenaga Nasional Berhad (TNB) for nine years.

Political career

Rise to prominence in BN and UMNO
Isham has been active within BN and UMNO. Before he was appointed as Member of the Supreme Council of UMNO, Isham was also appointed and served as the State Information Chief of BN of Selangor.

Contesting in the 2022 General Election
In the 2022 general election, he was hinted and expected to contest for the Shah Alam federal seat. On 1 November 2022, he was confirmed to be nominated as a candidate representing the BN coalition to contest for the seat but eventually lost to Pakatan Harapan candidate Azli Yusof.

Election results

References

External links 
 Isham Jalil Official Website
 
 

Living people
Malaysian people of Malay descent
Malaysian Muslims
United Malays National Organisation politicians
21st-century Malaysian politicians
Alumni of the University of Bristol
Wharton School of the University of Pennsylvania alumni
Harvard Kennedy School alumni
Year of birth missing (living people)